Porky's Spring Planting is a 1938 Warner Bros. Looney Tunes cartoon directed by Frank Tashlin. The short was released on July 25, 1938, and stars Porky Pig.

Plot
Porky Pig begins ploughing his land and planting seeds, with some help from his dog Streamline. They plant many kinds of vegetables. But when the crops are ripe, a rooster sells tickets to other chickens who make a self-servicing cafe out of the field. Porky notices and tries to chase them off, but they persist. He tries everything to get the chicken to leave from a scarecrow to sending his dog Streamline but to no avail. To protect the last of his crops, Porky makes a deal with the chickens to plant a separate vegetable garden for them.

References

External links
 

1938 films
1938 short films
1938 comedy films
1938 animated films
1930s American animated films
1930s animated short films
1930s English-language films
1930s Warner Bros. animated short films
Looney Tunes shorts
Porky Pig films
Animated films about dogs
Films about pets
Animated films about chickens
Films about agriculture
Animated films set in the United States
Films set on farms
Films set in restaurants
Films set in 1938
Short films directed by Frank Tashlin
Films scored by Carl Stalling
Warner Bros. Cartoons animated short films